The Sixth Sense is an album by American jazz pianist Don Pullen recorded in 1985 for the Italian Black Saint label.

Reception
The Allmusic review by Stephen Cook awarded the album 4 stars stating "Reflecting Pullen's own quality piano work, all the soloists make impressive contributions throughout. A nice place to start for the Pullen newcomer".

Track listing
All compositions by Don Pullen except as indicated
 "The Sixth Sense" (Don Pullen, Frank Dean)- 9:46
 "In the Beginning" - 11:56
 "Tales From the Bright Side" - 8:53
 "Gratitude" - 7:36
 "All Is Well" - 1:58
Recorded at Classic Sound Studios in New York City on June 12 & 13, 1985

Personnel
Don Pullen - piano
Olu Dara - trumpet
Donald Harrison - alto saxophone
Fred Hopkins - bass
Bobby Battle - drums

References

Black Saint/Soul Note albums
Don Pullen albums
1985 albums